The Alabama Crimson Tide football program represents the University of Alabama (variously Alabama, UA, or Bama) in the sport of American football. The team competes in the Football Bowl Subdivision (FBS) of the National Collegiate Athletic Association (NCAA) and the Western Division of the Southeastern Conference (SEC). The team's head coach is Nick Saban, who has led the Tide to six national championships over his tenure. The Crimson Tide is among the most storied and decorated football programs in NCAA history. Since beginning play in 1892, the program claims 18 national championships, including 13 wire-service (AP or Coaches') national titles in the poll-era, and five other titles before the poll-era. From 1958 to 1982, the team was led by Hall of Fame coach Paul "Bear" Bryant, who won six national titles with the program. Despite numerous national and conference championships, it was not until 2009 that an Alabama player received a Heisman Trophy, when running back Mark Ingram II became the university's first winner. In 2015, Derrick Henry became the university's second Heisman winner. The Crimson Tide won back to back Heisman trophies in 2020 and 2021, with DeVonta Smith and Bryce Young.

Alabama has 953 official victories in NCAA Division I (an additional 21 victories were vacated, and eight victories and one tie were forfeited). Alabama has won 33 conference championships (4 Southern Conference and 29 SEC championships), and has made an NCAA-record 76 postseason bowl appearances. The program has 36 seasons with ten wins or more (plus one vacated) and has 46[b] bowl victories, both NCAA records. The Crimson Tide leads the SEC West Division with 17 division titles and 14 appearances in the SEC Championship Game. Alabama holds a winning record against every current and former SEC school. The Associated Press (AP) ranks Alabama fourth in all-time final AP Poll appearances, with 59 through the 2021 season.

Alabama plays its home games at Bryant–Denny Stadium, located on the campus in Tuscaloosa, Alabama. With a capacity of 101,821, Bryant-Denny is the 10th largest non-racing stadium in the world and the eighth largest stadium in the United States.

History

Head coaching history

Alabama has had 28 head coaches since organized football began in 1892. Adopting the nickname "Crimson Tide" after the 1907 season, 12 coaches have led the Crimson Tide in postseason bowl games: Wallace Wade, Frank Thomas, Harold D. "Red" Drew, Bear Bryant, Ray Perkins, Bill Curry, Gene Stallings, Mike DuBose, Dennis Franchione, Mike Shula, Joe Kines, and Nick Saban. Eight of those coaches also won conference championships: Wade, Thomas, Drew, Bryant, Curry, Stallings, DuBose, and Saban. During their tenures, Wade, Thomas, Bryant, Stallings, and Saban all won national championships with the Crimson Tide.

Of the 27 different head coaches who have led the Crimson Tide, Wade, Thomas, Bryant, and Stallings have been inducted into the College Football Hall of Fame. The head coach is Nick Saban, who was hired in January 2007.

National championships
National championships in NCAA FBS college football are debated as the NCAA does not officially award the championship. Despite not naming an official National Champion, the NCAA provides lists of championships awarded by "major selectors." According to the official NCAA 2009 Division I Football Records Book, "During the last 138 years, there have been more than 30 selectors of national champions using polls, historical research and mathematical rating systems. Beginning in 1936, the Associated Press began the best-known and most widely circulated poll of sportswriters and broadcasters. Before 1936, national champions were determined by historical research and retroactive ratings and polls. [...] The criteria for being included in this historical list of poll selectors is that the poll be national in scope, either through distribution in newspaper, television, radio and/or computer online."

Since World War II, Alabama claims only national championships awarded by the final AP Poll or the final Coaches' Poll. This policy is consistent with other FBS football programs with numerous national title claims, including Notre Dame, USC, and Oklahoma, except that in the pre-1936 era, unlike Alabama, there are major selectors' titles that these schools do not claim. All national championships claimed by the University of Alabama were published in nationally syndicated newspapers and magazines, and each of the national championship selectors, and are cited in the Official 2010 NCAA FBS Record Book. In addition to the championships claimed by the university, the NCAA has listed Alabama as receiving a championship for the 1945, 1966, 1975, and 1977 college football seasons.

In Alabama's 1982 media guide, the last for Coach Bryant, 1934 is listed as the only national championship before Coach Bryant in a footnote about the school's SEC history. In the 1980s, Alabama's Sports Information Director Wayne Atcheson started recognizing five pre-Bryant national championship teams (1925, 1926, 1930, 1934, 1941) by adding them to the university's Football Media Guide. According to Atcheson, he made the effort in the context of disputed titles being claimed by other schools, and "to make Alabama football look the best it could look" to compete with the other claimants. Atcheson maintains that the titles are the school's rightful claims. Four of the five championships claimed in the Media Guide come before the AP poll was introduced in 1936. Many schools claim national championships from pre-1936 because there was no contemporary or nationally recognized authoritative source before that year.

The University of Alabama 2009 Official Football Media Guide says Alabama had 12 national championships prior to winning the 2010 BCS National Championship Game. The 2009, 2011, 2012, 2015, 2017, and 2020 titles bring the total number of national championships claimed by Alabama to 18. Thirteen of Alabama's national championships were awarded by the wire-services (AP, Coaches' Poll) or by winning the BCS National Championship Game.

In January 2013, CNN suggested that Alabama might be college football's new dynasty, and in May 2013, Athlon Sports ranked Alabama's ongoing dynasty as the fourth-best since 1934, behind Oklahoma (1948–58), Miami (1986–92), and Nebraska (1993–97).

National championship seasons

 1925 – The 1925 Alabama Crimson Tide football team, coached by Wallace Wade, completed the regular season 9–0–0, winning the Southern Conference championship. Alabama was then invited to play Washington in the January 1, 1926 Rose Bowl. Coach Wade's team initially fell behind the undefeated Huskies, but rallied in the second half to defeat Washington 20–19. The outstanding player of the game was Johnny Mack Brown. This game is viewed by many football historians as the single most important event for Southern football, and is hailed "the football game that changed the South." Alabama was the first Southern football team to be invited to play in the Rose Bowl and proved Southern teams could compete with those from the East, the Midwest and the West coast. The victory for Coach Wallace Wade established Alabama as a football powerhouse. The 1925 Alabama football team finished the season with a 10–0–0 record and was retrospectively selected national champion by William Boand, Richard Billingsley, and the one-man Helms Athletic Foundation. The 2009 NCAA Record Book cites the Michigan Wolverines, Dartmouth Indians, and Alabama Crimson Tide as national champions in 1925.
 1926 – The 1926 Alabama Crimson Tide football team, coached by Wallace Wade, completed the regular season 9–0–0, winning the Southern Conference championship. Alabama was then invited to play Stanford in the January 1, 1927, Rose Bowl. Coach Wade's team tied the Indians 7–7 to finish the season 9–0–1. The outstanding player of the game was Fred Pickhard. The 1926 Alabama football team was retrospectively selected national champion by Billingsley and the Helms Athletic Foundation. The 2009 NCAA Record Book cites the Lafayette Leopards, Michigan Wolverines, Naval Academy Midshipmen, Stanford Cardinal, and Alabama Crimson Tide as national champions in 1926.
 1930 – The 1930 Alabama Crimson Tide football team, coached by Wallace Wade, completed the regular season 9–0–0, winning the Southern Conference championship. Alabama was then invited to play Washington State in the January 1, 1931, Rose Bowl. Coach Wade's team defeated the Cougars 24–0 to finish the season 10–0–0. The outstanding player of the game was John Campbell. The 1930 Alabama and Notre Dame teams were selected as "Outstanding Nationwide Teams" by Parke H. Davis in 1933.
 1934 – The 1934 Alabama Crimson Tide football team, coached by Frank Thomas, completed the regular season 9–0–0, winning the Southeastern Conference championship. Alabama was then invited to play Stanford in the January 1, 1935, Rose Bowl. Coach Thomas' team defeated the Indians 29–13 to finish the season 10–0–0. The outstanding player of the game was Millard "Dixie" Howell. The 1934 Alabama football team was contemporaneously selected national champion under mathematical systems by Dick Dunkel, Deke Houlgate, and the Williamson system. The 2009 NCAA Record Book cites the Minnesota Golden Gophers and Alabama Crimson Tide as national champions in 1934. The University of Alabama honored Ben McLeod, Jr., the 95-year–old former backup End of the 1934 team at the September 6, 2008 Alabama–Tulane game.
 1941 – The 1941 Alabama Crimson Tide football team, coached by Frank Thomas, completed the regular season 8–2–0. Alabama's squad finished third in the Southeastern Conference. After losing to Mississippi State 14-0 and Vanderbilt, 7–0, Alabama finished the regular season ranked No.20 in the AP Poll, which was published on December 1, 1941, before the bowl games, which was customary during that time. The onset of World War II changed the college football postseason. Alabama was one of ten teams chosen for post-season competition when they were invited to play Texas A&M in the January 1, 1942, Cotton Bowl Classic. Coach Thomas' team defeated the Aggies 29–21 to finish the season 9–2–0. Minnesota, the AP national champion, finished 8–0 and did not play in a bowl game per BigTen rules. Alabama's outstanding players of the game were Holt Rast, Don Whitmire, and Jimmy Nelson. The squad was selected national champion under a mathematical system created by Deke Houlgate, who in later years published the nationally syndicated Football Thesaurus. The 2009 NCAA Record Book cites the Minnesota Golden Gophers, Texas Longhorns, and Alabama Crimson Tide as national champions in 1941.
 1961 – The 1961 Alabama Crimson Tide football team, coached by Bear Bryant, completed the regular season 10–0–0, winning the Southeastern Conference championship. Led by quarterback Pat Trammell, linebacker Lee Roy Jordan and two–way lineman Billy Neighbors, Alabama outscored their opponents 297–25. Alabama was then invited to play the No. 9–ranked Arkansas Razorbacks in the January 1, 1962 Sugar Bowl. Coach Bryant's team defeated the Razorbacks 10–3 to finish the season 11–0–0. The outstanding player of the game was Mike Fracchia. The 1961 Alabama football team was selected national champion by the AP Poll and Coaches' Poll.
 1964 – The 1964 Alabama Crimson Tide football team, coached by Bear Bryant, completed the regular season 10–0–0, winning the Southeastern Conference championship. Alabama was led by quarterback Joe Namath. Alabama was then invited to play the Texas Longhorns in the Orange Bowl on January 1, 1965. Coach Bryant's team lost to the Longhorns 21–17 to finish the season 10–1–0. The outstanding player of the game was Joe Namath. The 1964 Alabama football team was selected national champion by the AP Poll and the Coaches' Poll prior to bowl games. (The AP Poll waited until after the bowl games to select its champion for the 1965 season.)
 1965 – The 1965 Alabama Crimson Tide football team, coached by Bear Bryant, completed the regular season 8–1–1, winning the Southeastern Conference championship. The Tide lost to Georgia and tied Tennessee during the regular season. Alabama was then invited to play Nebraska in the January 1, 1966 Orange Bowl. Coach Bryant's team defeated the Cornhuskers 39–28 to finish the season 9–1–1. The outstanding player of the game was Steve Sloan. The 1965 Alabama football team was selected national champion by the AP Poll. The Coaches' Poll selected Michigan State.
 1973 – The 1973 Alabama Crimson Tide football team, coached by Bear Bryant, completed the regular season 11–0–0, winning the Southeastern Conference championship. Alabama was then invited to play Notre Dame in the December 31, 1973, Sugar Bowl. Coach Bryant's team lost to the Fighting Irish 24–23 to finish the season 11–1–0. The 1973 Alabama football team was selected national champion in the final regular-season Coaches' Poll, which was finalized prior to the post-season bowl games. (The Coaches' Poll began selecting their champion after the bowl games starting in 1974.) The post-bowl game AP Poll ranked Alabama fourth, and selected Notre Dame as its national champion.
 1978 – The 1978 Alabama Crimson Tide football team, coached by Bear Bryant, completed the regular season 10–1–0, winning the Southeastern Conference championship. The Tide defeated No. 10–ranked Nebraska 20–3, and defeated No. 11–ranked Missouri 38–20, and lost to No. 7 ranked Southern California 24–14, during the regular season. The No. 2 ranked Alabama Crimson Tide was then invited to play the No. 1–ranked Penn State in the January 1, 1979 Sugar Bowl. Coach Bryant's team defeated the Nittany Lions 14–7 to finish the season 11–1–0. The outstanding player of the game was linebacker Barry Krauss. Alabama was selected national champion by the AP Poll, and Southern California was selected national champion by the Coaches' Poll.
 1979 – The 1979 Alabama Crimson Tide football team, coached by Bear Bryant, completed the regular season 11–0–0, winning the Southeastern Conference championship. The Tide defeated No. 18–ranked Tennessee 27–17, and defeated No. 14–ranked Auburn 25–18 during the regular season. Alabama was then invited to play No. 6–ranked Arkansas in the January 1, 1980 Sugar Bowl. Coach Bryant's team defeated the Razorbacks 24–9 to finish the season 12–0–0. The outstanding player of the game was running back Major Ogilvie. The 1979 Alabama football team was selected national champion by the AP Poll and the Coaches' Poll.
 1992 – The 1992 Alabama Crimson Tide football team, coached by Gene Stallings, completed the regular season 11–0–0. They then defeated No. 12–ranked Florida in the inaugural SEC Championship Game, defeating the Gators 28–21; the win gave Alabama its 20th SEC title and a record of 12–0–0. Alabama was then invited to play No. 1–ranked Miami, led by Heisman Trophy winner Gino Torretta, in the Bowl Coalition National Championship Game, 1993 Sugar Bowl. Coach Stallings' team defeated the Hurricanes 34–13 to finish the season 13–0–0. The outstanding player of the game was Derrick Lassic. The 1992 Alabama football team was awarded the national championship by the AP Poll and the Coaches' Poll.

 2009 – The 2009 Alabama Crimson Tide football team, coached by Nick Saban, finished with a 12–0 regular season. In the twelve wins, the Crimson Tide defeated four teams that were ranked at the time, including an opening day victory over No.7 Virginia Tech in the Chick-fil-A Kickoff Game. The team headed back to the Georgia Dome in December to face off against No. 1 Florida in the SEC Championship Game. The Crimson Tide defeated the Gators 32–13 in a rematch of the previous year's championship. Alabama then traveled to Pasadena to face No. 2 ranked Texas in the 2010 BCS National Championship Game at the Rose Bowl. Alabama's Heisman Trophy-winning running back, Mark Ingram II, rushed for 116yards and two touchdowns in a 37–21 win. This was Alabama's first victory over Texas (1–7–1). Ingram was named the game's offensive MVP in Alabama's first BCS victory. The 2009 Alabama football team was selected national champion by the AP and Coaches' Polls. The 2009 squad became the first FBS division team to defeat six teams ranked in the AP top 25 during one season and received a record six first-team AP All-America selections. The 2009 team finished with a perfect 14–0 record, an all-time highest number of wins in a season for Alabama.
 2011 – The 2011 Alabama Crimson Tide football team, coached by Nick Saban, completed the regular season 11–1. The only loss of the season was to LSU in overtime 9–6. The team did not play in the SEC Championship Game because of that loss, but won convincingly in its final three regular-season games and earned a No.2 ranking in the BCS poll. For their final regular season game, Alabama defeated rival Auburn 42–14. Alabama, led by Heisman trophy finalist Trent Richardson, then qualified to play No.1 ranked LSU in the 2012 BCS National Championship Game. Coach Saban's team defeated the Tigers 21–0 and finished the season 12–1. Jeremy Shelley had a bowl record-tying five field goals in the game, and the game's offensive MVP was A. J. McCarron, and the defensive MVP was Courtney Upshaw. With the win, Alabama became the first team to shutout its opponent in a BCS bowl game. In addition to winning the BCS National Championship, the AP also awarded its national title to Alabama for the eighth time.
 2012 – The 2012 Alabama Crimson Tide football team, coached by Nick Saban, completed the regular season 11–1. The only loss of the season was against Texas A&M 29–24. Despite the loss, Alabama won the SEC Western division and went to the 2012 SEC Championship Game, where they defeated Georgia 32–28 for the 23rd conference championship in school history. Alabama earned a No.2 ranking in the final BCS rankings for the second straight year and as a result qualified for the 2013 BCS National Championship Game against No.1 Notre Dame. Alabama defeated the Fighting Irish 42–14, finished the season 13–1, and the game's offensive MVP was Eddie Lacy, and the defensive MVP was C. J. Mosley. Alabama became the third team in history to win three national championships in a four-year period. This was Alabama's ninth AP national championship and tenth wire-service championship.
 2015 – The 2015 Alabama Crimson Tide football team, coached by Nick Saban, finished the regular season 11–1. Their only loss was to Ole Miss 43–37. They won the SEC Western Division title with a record of 7–1, defeating rivals LSU and Tennessee en route, and then defeated Florida 29–15 in the SEC Championship. Alabama returned to the playoffs for the second consecutive season. After falling short in the semifinals against Ohio State in 2014, Alabama defeated the Michigan State Spartans 38–0 in the Cotton Bowl to advance to the Championship Game. Alabama beat the Clemson Tigers 45–40 and won the 2015 FBS national championship. Alabama's Heisman Trophy-winning running back Derrick Henry rushed for 158yards and three touchdowns. This victory gave Coach Nick Saban his fifth national title, including four in the last seven seasons.
 2017 – The 2017 Alabama Crimson Tide football team, coached by Nick Saban, finished the regular season 11–1. Their only loss was at Auburn 26–14. They won a share of the SEC Western Division title with a record of 7–1. Alabama returned to the playoffs for the fourth consecutive season. Alabama avenged the previous season's only loss in the National Championship game to Clemson with a 24–6 win in the Sugar Bowl. The Tide advanced to the Championship game for the third year in a row. Alabama defeated SEC opponent Georgia 26–23 in overtime. The victory gave Nick Saban his sixth national title, tying him with Paul W. Bryant for most all-time. It's also Alabama's fifth title in the last nine seasons.
 2020 – The 2020 Alabama Crimson Tide football team, coached by Nick Saban, finished the regular season 10–0. The season was shortened to an all-conference schedule due to the COVID-19 pandemic. The Tide won the SEC Western Division title and defeated Florida 52–46 in the SEC Championship. Alabama returned to the playoffs for the sixth time in seven seasons. They defeated Notre Dame 31–14 in the Rose Bowl. The Tide advanced to the Championship game where they beat Ohio State 52–24. Alabama's Heisman Trophy-winning wide receiver DeVonta Smith had 215 yards and 3 touchdowns. The victory gave Saban his seventh national title, passing Bear Bryant for most all-time. It is also Alabama's sixth title in twelve years.

Conference championships
Alabama has won a total of 33 conference championships; this includes four Southern Conference and 29 SEC Championships. Alabama captured its four Southern Conference titles in 1924, 1925, 1926, and 1930. Alabama captured the first SEC title in 1933 and has won a total of 29 SEC Championships (1933, 1934, 1937, 1945, 1953, 1961, 1964, 1965, 1966, 1971, 1972, 1973, 1974, 1975, 1977, 1978, 1979, 1981, 1989†, 1992, 1999, 2009, 2012, 2014, 2015, 2016, 2018, 2020, 2021). The school has won more SEC football titles than any other school, including 10 since the conference split into separate divisions and added the Championship Game in 1992. Alabama is the only school to win an SEC Championship in every decade since the conference was founded in 1933.

† Co-champions

Division championships
The SEC has been split into two divisions since the 1992 season. Alabama competes in the SEC West. Alabama has won or shared 17 division titles, and has posted an 10–4 record in the SEC Championship Game .

† Co-champions

Individual accomplishments

First team All-Americans

Every year, several publications release lists of their ideal "team". The athletes on these lists are referred to as All-Americans. The NCAA recognizes five All-American lists. They are the Associated Press (AP), American Football Coaches Association (AFCA), Football Writers Association of America (FWAA), Sporting News (TSN), and the Walter Camp Football Foundation (WCFF). Alabama has had 149 players honored 173 times as first team All-Americans (84 consensus) in its history, including 20 players honored twice and two players (Cornelius Bennett and Woodrow Lowe) who were honored three times as a First Team All-American.

The most recent All-Americans from Alabama came after the 2022 season, when Will Anderson Jr. and Brian Branch were each named First Team All-America by various selectors.

College Football Hall of Fame inductees

In 1951, the College Football Hall of Fame opened in South Bend, Indiana. Since then, Alabama has had 22 players and four former coaches inducted into the Hall of Fame. Alabama had two members inducted into the inaugural 1951 class—Don Hutson and Frank Thomas.

Award winners

Overall

 Heisman Trophy
Mark Ingram II (2009)
Derrick Henry (2015)
DeVonta Smith (2020)
Bryce Young (2021)
 Maxwell Award
A. J. McCarron (2013)
Derrick Henry (2015)
Tua Tagovailoa (2018)
 DeVonta Smith (2020)
Bryce Young (2021)
 Walter Camp Award
 Derrick Henry (2015)
 Tua Tagovailoa (2018)
 DeVonta Smith (2020)
 AP Player of the Year
 DeVonta Smith (2020)
 Bryce Young (2021)
 Sporting News Player of the Year
Mark Ingram (2009)
Tua Tagovailoa (2018)
DeVonta Smith (2020)
Bryce Young (2021)
 Lombardi Award
Cornelius Bennett (1986)
Jonathan Allen (2016)
Will Anderson Jr. (2022)
 Chuck Bednarik Award
Jonathan Allen (2016)
Minkah Fitzpatrick (2017)
Will Anderson Jr. (2022)
 Bronko Nagurski Trophy
Jonathan Allen (2016)
Will Anderson Jr. (2021, 2022)
 Paul Hornung Award
 DeVonta Smith (2020)

Positional

 Davey O'Brien Award
 Mac Jones (2020)
 Bryce Young (2021)
 Doak Walker Award
Trent Richardson (2011)
Derrick Henry (2015)
Najee Harris (2020)
 Fred Biletnikoff Award
Amari Cooper (2014)
Jerry Jeudy (2018)
 DeVonta Smith (2020)
 Butkus Award
Derrick Thomas (1988)
Rolando McClain (2009)
 C. J. Mosley (2013)
 Reuben Foster (2016)
 Johnny Unitas Golden Arm Award
Jay Barker (1994)
A. J. McCarron (2013)
 Mac Jones (2020)
 Jim Thorpe Award
Antonio Langham (1993)
Minkah Fitzpatrick (2017)
 Outland Trophy
Chris Samuels (1999)
Andre Smith (2008)
Barrett Jones (2011)
Cam Robinson (2016)
Quinnen Williams (2018)
Alex Leatherwood (2020)
 Rimington Trophy
Barrett Jones (2012)
Ryan Kelly (2015)
Landon Dickerson (2020)
 Ted Hendricks Award
Jonathan Allen (2016)
 Manning Award
 Mac Jones (2020)
 Bryce Young (2021)
 Joe Moore Award
Offensive Line (2015, 2020)
 Patrick Mannelly Award
Thomas Fletcher (2020)

Other

 Lott Trophy
DeMeco Ryans (2005)
Will Anderson Jr. (2022)
 Wuerffel Trophy
Barrett Jones (2011)
 William V. Campbell Trophy
Barrett Jones (2012)
 Sammy Baugh Trophy
Steve Sloan (1965)
 Paul Warfield Trophy
David Palmer (1993)
Amari Cooper (2014)
 Jim Parker Trophy
Andre Smith (2008)
Barrett Jones (2011)
Jonah Williams (2018)
 Jack Lambert Trophy
Rolando McClain (2009)
 Jack Tatum Trophy
Antonio Langham (1993)
 Bill Willis Trophy
Quinnen Williams (2018)
 Kellen Moore Award
A. J. McCarron (2013)
 Jon Cornish Trophy
John Metchie III (2020, 2021)

Coaching

 Paul "Bear" Bryant Award
Gene Stallings (1992)
Nick Saban (2020)
 AFCA Coach of the Year
Paul "Bear" Bryant (1961, 1971, 1973)
Gene Stallings (1992)
 Eddie Robinson Coach of the Year
Gene Stallings (1992)
Nick Saban (2008)
 Walter Camp Coach of the Year
Gene Stallings (1992)
Nick Saban (2008, 2018)
 George Munger Award
Gene Stallings (1992)
Nick Saban (2016)
 Bobby Dodd Coach of the Year
Bill Curry (1989)
Nick Saban (2014)
 AP Coach of the Year
Nick Saban (2008)
 Sporting News Coach of the Year
Nick Saban (2008)
 Home Depot Coach of the Year
Nick Saban (2008)
 Liberty Mutual Coach of the Year Award
Nick Saban (2008)
 Bobby Bowden Coach of the Year
Nick Saban (2009, 2011, 2012)
 Broyles Award
Kirby Smart (2009)
Mike Locksley (2018)
Steve Sarkisian (2020)
 AFCA Assistant Coach of the Year
Kirby Smart (2012)

Heisman Trophy
On December 12, 2009, Mark Ingram II became Alabama's first Heisman Trophy winner. In the closest race ever, he edged out Stanford running back Toby Gerhart by 28 points. Other notable finishes for an Alabama player occurred in 1993, when David Palmer finished third in the Heisman voting and when A. J. McCarron finished as runner-up for the 2013 season. Derrick Henry became Alabama's second Heisman trophy winner on December 12, 2015. Tua Tagovailoa finished runner-up for the 2018 season as well. For the 2020 season, Alabama became the second program in college football history to have three players finish in the top five. DeVonta Smith became Alabama's third Heisman winner with Mac Jones finishing third and Najee Harris fifth. In 2021, Bryce Young became the fourth winner with Will Anderson Jr. finishing fifth.  With its fourth Heisman winner Alabama has produced the fifth most Heisman trophies of all time behind Notre Dame, Oklahoma, Ohio State and USC.

Top 5 finishes for Alabama players:

SEC Legends

Starting in 1994, the Southeastern Conference has annually honored one former football player from each of the SEC member schools as an "SEC Legend". The following former Crimson Tide football players have been honored as SEC Legends.

 1994 Lee Roy Jordan
 1995 Harry Gilmer
 1996 Billy Neighbors
 1997 John Hannah
 1998 Holt Rast
 1999 Johnny Musso
 2000 Dwight Stephenson
 2001 Joe Namath
 2002 Vaughn Mancha
 2003 Jeremiah Castille
 2004 Bob Baumhower
 2005 Cornelius Bennett
 2006 Steve Sloan
 2007 Ken Stabler
 2008 Bart Starr
 2009 Antonio Langham
 2010 Cornelius Griffin
 2011 Dennis Homan
 2012 Paul Crane
 2013 Marty Lyons
 2014 Bobby Humphrey
 2015 Woodrow Lowe
 2016 Chris Samuels
 2017 Gene Stallings
 2018 Shaun Alexander
 2019 Ray Perkins

Rivalries

Auburn

The main rivalry of the Crimson Tide is against its in-state rival, Auburn University; considered one of the top sporting rivalries in the US. The Alabama-Auburn game has come to be known as the Iron Bowl. The outcome of the game generally determines "bragging rights" in the state of Alabama until the following contest. The game may also have implications as to which team will represent the SEC Western Division in the SEC Championship Game.

On February 22, 1893, at Lakeview Park in Birmingham, Auburn was victorious in the first ever Iron Bowl, 32–22. The series was suspended after the 1907 contest, due to violence and financial complications. In 1944, Auburn suggested to reopen the series, though the board of trustees at Alabama rejected. The series was resumed in 1948, with Alabama crushing the Tigers 55–0, which is still the largest margin of victory in the series. In the following contest, Auburn shocked Alabama with a 14–13 victory, which is credited with helping revive the series.

For many years, the contest was held at Legion Field in Birmingham, before the teams began alternating between Bryant-Denny Stadium, in Tuscaloosa, and Jordan–Hare Stadium, in Auburn. Alabama won the most recent meeting 49-27 in Tuscaloosa, and leads the series at 49–37–1.

Tennessee

Despite the heated in-state rivalry with Auburn, Bear Bryant was more adamant about defeating his rivals to the north, the Tennessee Volunteers. The series is named the Third Saturday in October, the traditional calendar date on which the game was played. Despite the name, the game has been played on the third Saturday only five times between 1995 and 2007. The first game between the two sides was played in 1901 in Birmingham, ending in a 6–6 tie. From 1902 to 1913, Alabama dominated the series, losing only once, and never allowing a touchdown by the Volunteers. Beginning in 1928, the rivalry was first played on its traditional date and began to be a challenge for the Crimson Tide as Robert Neyland began challenging Alabama for their perennial spot on top of the conference standings. In the 1950s, Jim Goostree, the head trainer for Alabama, began another tradition as he began handing out cigars following a victory over the Volunteers.

Between 1971 and 1981, Alabama held an 11-game winning streak over the Volunteers and, between 1986 and 1994, a nine-game unbeaten streak. However, following Alabama's streak, Tennessee responded with a seven-game winning streak from 1995 to 2001. Alabama holds the longest winning streak at 15 from 2007 to 2021. Tennessee won the most recent meeting 52–49 in Knoxville, while Alabama leads the series 58–38–8.

LSU

A rivalry within the SEC Western Division occurs yearly between Alabama and the LSU Tigers. Starting in 1895, the Tigers were victorious 12–6 in the first meeting. The teams did not regularly meet until the mid-1960s during Alabama's dominance of the SEC. Between 1971 and 1981, the Crimson Tide won 11 consecutive times. In the 1969 game, LSU defeated Alabama 20–15 in Baton Rouge. Alabama did not lose again in Baton Rouge until 2000.

In 2007, the meeting was more heated following Alabama's hiring of head coach Nick Saban, who previously coached at LSU. With the hiring, many media outlets dubbed the 2007 meeting as the "Saban Bowl". The Crimson Tide lost the first "Saban Bowl" in 2007, won the 2008 and 2009 meetings only to lose in Baton Rouge in 2010.

In 2011, the teams played as the consensus No.1 and No.2 ranked teams in the polls with LSU winning 9–6 in overtime. They played each other again for the BCS National Championship with Alabama winning 21–0 to secure its 14th National Championship. LSU won the most recent meeting 32-31 in OT in Baton Rouge, while Alabama leads the series 55–27-5.

Ole Miss 

Alabama also maintains a rivalry with the Ole Miss Rebels. Alabama won the most recent meeting 30-24 in Oxford, and leads the series 54–10–2.

Mississippi State

Alabama's most-played rival is Mississippi State. The rivalry has been called the "Battle for Highway 82", with the schools being only 90 miles apart. Many cite the 2014 meeting as the biggest game in the series where Alabama faced a #1 ranked, 10–0 Mississippi State team with Dak Prescott as its quarterback. Alabama won 25–20, which helped catapult them into the first College Football Playoff. Alabama won the most recent meeting 30–6 in Tuscaloosa and leads the series 85–18–3.

Clemson

The series dates back to 1900 but the rivalry has intensified in recent years, with the last four meetings having national championship implications. Alabama leads the series 14–5.

Florida

Alabama has a rivalry with the Florida Gators, which was largely developed with the start of the SEC Championship Game. Alabama and Florida have met in 10 SEC Title Games (Alabama leads 6–4 in Title games), including the first 3 from 1992 to 1994.  Alabama won the most recent meeting 31–29 in Gainesville, and leads the entire series 28–14 on the field (27–14 with the Alabama 2005 win vacated).

Georgia

Alabama has a rivalry with the Georgia Bulldogs. Alabama has 42 wins in the series while the Bulldogs have 26 wins. Georgia  won the most recent meeting 33–18 in the 2022 College Football Playoff National Championship while Alabama leads the series 42–26–4.

Former rivalries
The Georgia Tech Yellow Jackets were at one time considered Alabama's arch rival. During the suspension of the Iron Bowl between 1907 and 1948, Georgia Tech (then a member of the SEC) emerged as the most intense game on Alabama's schedule. The teams played many significant games, especially in the late 1950s and early 1960s. A heated feud developed between Bear Bryant and Georgia Tech head coach Bobby Dodd following a controversial hit in the 1961 game, a 10–0 Alabama victory. Dodd cited this feud as the primary impetus for Georgia Tech leaving the SEC three years later. The two teams have met 52 times, making Georgia Tech Alabama's most played among current non-conference opponents. Alabama leads the series 28–21–3; Georgia Tech won the last meeting in 1984. Alabama's fight song, "Yea Alabama", mentions Georgia Tech with the line "Send the Yellow Jackets to a watery grave."

There have been many historic games between Alabama and Penn State. The two teams met five times during the tenure of Bear Bryant, including in the 1979 Sugar Bowl, which determined the national championship for the 1978 season. The games usually have national implicationsseven of the 15 meetings between the two schools have featured both teams ranked in the top tenand eight of the meetings have been decided by a touchdown or less. The most recent game was in 2011, with Alabama winning 27–11. It was the final loss for long-time Penn State head coach Joe Paterno. Alabama leads the series 10–5.

All-time record vs. current SEC teams
Official record (including any NCAA imposed vacates and forfeits) against all current SEC opponents as of the completion of the 2022 season.

Bowl games

This is a partial list of the ten most recent bowl seasons in which Alabama competed. Alabama has an overall bowl record of 46-27-3 (76 games) through the 2022 season.

Alabama and the NFL

Pro Football Hall of Fame
Eight former Alabama football players have been inducted into the Pro Football Hall of Fame, the fourth most among all colleges.

Players in the National Football League

 Christopher Allen, LB - Denver Broncos
 Jonathan Allen, DT - Washington Commanders
 Jalyn Armour-Davis, CB - Baltimore Ravens
 Anthony Averett, CB - Las Vegas Raiders
 Christian Barmore, DL - New England Patriots
 Bradley Bozeman, C - Carolina Panthers
 Deonte Brown, OG - Carolina Panthers
 Tony Brown, CB - Indianapolis Colts
 Isaiah Buggs, DT - Detroit Lions
 Landon Collins, S - New York Giants
 Amari Cooper, WR - Cleveland Browns
 Lester Cotton, OL - Miami Dolphins
 Raekwon Davis, DT - Miami Dolphins
 Landon Dickerson, C - Philadelphia Eagles
 Trevon Diggs, CB - Dallas Cowboys
 Kenyan Drake, RB - Baltimore Ravens
 Rashaan Evans, LB - Atlanta Falcons
 Minkah Fitzpatrick, FS - Pittsburgh Steelers
 Da'Shawn Hand, DE - Tennessee Titans
 Christian Harris, LB - Houston Texans
 Damien Harris, RB - New England Patriots
 Najee Harris, RB - Pittsburgh Steelers
 Ronnie Harrison, SS - Cleveland Browns
 J. C. Hassenauer, C - Pittsburgh Steelers
 Derrick Henry, RB - Tennessee Titans
 O. J. Howard, TE - Houston Texans
 Marlon Humphrey, CB - Baltimore Ravens
 Mark Ingram II, RB - New Orleans Saints
 Eddie Jackson, S - Chicago Bears
 Kareem Jackson, S - Denver Broncos
 Josh Jacobs, RB - Las Vegas Raiders
 Anfernee Jennings, LB - New England Patriots
 Jerry Jeudy, WR - Denver Broncos
 Josh Jobe, CB - Philadelphia Eagles
 Julio Jones, WR - Tampa Bay Buccaneers
 Mac Jones, QB - New England Patriots
 Ryan Kelly, C - Indianapolis Colts
 Alex Leatherwood, OL - Chicago Bears
 Terrell Lewis, LB - Chicago Bears
 Phidarian Mathis, DT - Washington Commanders
 Jared Mayden, S - Buffalo Bills
 Xavier McKinney, S - New York Giants
 John Metchie III, WR - Houston Texans
 C. J. Mosley, LB - New York Jets
 Evan Neal, OT - New York Giants
 Daron Payne, DT - Washington Commanders
 Ross Pierschbacher, OL - Detroit Lions
 Reggie Ragland, LB - Cleveland Browns 
 LaBryan Ray, DT - New England Patriots 
 Jarran Reed, DT - Green Bay Packers
 Calvin Ridley, WR - Atlanta Falcons
 A'Shawn Robinson, DT - Los Angeles Rams
 Brian Robinson Jr., RB - Washington Commanders
 Cam Robinson, OT - Jacksonville Jaguars
 J. K. Scott, P - Los Angeles Chargers
 Cam Sims, WR - Washington Commanders
 DeVonta Smith, WR - Philadelphia Eagles
 Irv Smith Jr., TE - Minnesota Vikings
 Patrick Surtain II, CB - Denver Broncos
 Tua Tagovailoa, QB - Miami Dolphins
 Deionte Thompson, S - Jacksonville Jaguars
 Carson Tinker, LS - Seattle Seahawks
 Dalvin Tomlinson, DT - Cleveland Browns
 Jaylen Waddle, WR - Miami Dolphins
 Levi Wallace, CB - Pittsburgh Steelers
 Jameson Williams, WR - Detroit Lions
 Jonah Williams, OT - Cincinnati Bengals
 Quinnen Williams, DL - New York Jets
 Jedrick Wills, OT - Cleveland Browns
 Mack Wilson, LB - New England Patriots

Media
During the football season, the Crimson Tide Sports Network (CTSN) broadcasts multiple shows on gameday for most sports. The network includes more than 60 radio stations across the country. Radio stations WFFN-FM, WTSK-AM as a backup, broadcast all home games in the Tuscaloosa area.

Football radio broadcasts begin three hours prior to the game's designated kickoff time with Chris Stewart and Tyler Watts in Around the SEC. The radio broadcast then moves to the Crimson Tide Tailgate Party hosted by Tom Roberts. Immediately following the end of the game, the Fifth Quarter Show begins as host Eli Gold talks to coaches and players and gives game statistics. For the 2008 season, former Alabama players and personalities were brought on to provide guest commentary for each broadcast.

Current radio staff:
 Eli Gold – play-by-play
 John Parker Wilson – color analyst
 Rashad Johnson – sideline reporter
 Chris Stewart, Tyler Watts – pre- and post-game show co-host
 Tom Roberts – director of broadcasting
 Tom Stipe, Butch Owens, Brian Roberts – producers

 Stewart and Watts also provide play-by-play and color commentary respectively for CTSN pay-per-view television broadcasts.

Former radio staff:
 Bert Bank, founder of the Alabama Football Network, producer emeritus
 John Forney, play-by-play
 Jerry Duncan, sideline reporter
 Paul Kennedy, play-by-play
 Doug Layton, color analyst
 Ken Stabler, color analyst

Future opponents

Non-division conference opponents
Alabama plays Tennessee as a permanent non-division opponent annually and rotates around the East division among the other six schools.

Non-conference opponents 
Announced schedules as of August 8, 2022.

See also
 List of Alabama Crimson Tide home football stadiums
 University of Alabama traditions

Notes

References

Further reading

External links

 

 
Crimson Tide
American football teams established in 1892